Serbia and Montenegro consisted of two republics, Serbia with its capital in Belgrade and Montenegro with its capital in Podgorica.

Serbia

Serbia had two autonomous provinces (autonomna pokrajina / аутономна покрајина):
 Vojvodina with its capital in Novi Sad and
 Kosovo and Metohija with its capital in Priština (under UN 1999-2006)

The part of Serbia that was in neither (often called "Central Serbia") was not a province and had no special status. It had no capital nor a governing body.

Independently of this division, Serbia was further divided into 29 districts (okrug / округ) and the city of Belgrade. Each of districts (and the city) was further divided into municipalities (општина / opština).

Montenegro

Montenegro was divided into 21 municipalities (opština / општина).

See also
Municipalities of Serbia
List of cities in Serbia and Montenegro
ISO 3166-2:CS

Government of Serbia and Montenegro
Serbia and Montenegro